Phospholane is the organophosphorus compound with the formula (CH2)4PH.  This colorless liquid is the parent member of a family of five-membered, saturated rings containing phosphorus.  Although phospholane itself is only of minor academic interest, the class of C- and P-substituted phospholanes are valued ligands in asymmetric hydrogenation and related areas of homogeneous catalysis. 
Phospholane is prepared by reduction of 1-chlorophospholane, which in turn is obtained by the reaction of 1-phenylphospholane and phosphorus trichloride.

References

Phosphorus heterocycles
Five-membered rings